Rima, also known as "Rima the Jungle Girl", was a Edwardian-novel heroine. 

Rima may refer to:


Geography
 Rima, Morocco, a town and rural commune
 Rima, Qatana, Syria, a village
 Rima, Yabrud, Syria, a village
 Rima, Tibet, a town
 Rima River, a river in Nigeria
 Rima or Rimava, a river in Slovakia

People
 Rima (given name)
 Marco Rima (born 1961), Swiss actor, comedian, cabaret artist and producer
 Tommaso Rima (1775–1843), Swiss-Italian physician and surgeon

Other uses
 Rima Mashiro, a fictional character from the manga series Shugo Chara!
 Rima Touya, a character from the Vampire Knight anime and manga series
 The singular form of Rímur, Icelandic epic poems written in certain specific meters
 Review of Indonesian and Malaysian Affairs an Australia-based academic journal
 Reversible inhibitor of monoamine oxidase A, a class of drug
 Rwanda International Movie Award, an annual film award

See also
 Rima San Giuseppe, a town in northwestern Italy
 Rima Rima, a mountain in the Andes of Peru